Notre Dame de Lourdes, known from 2012 to 2018 as St. Bernadette Parish, is a former Roman Catholic parish in Fall River, Massachusetts. A part of the Roman Catholic Diocese of Fall River, the parish was established in 1874 to serve the growing French-Canadian population located in the city's Flint Village section.  Since its founding, the parish has occupied three different church buildings; a wooden structure (1874–1893), a spectacular granite church (1906–1982) and the current modern church (1986-2018). The parish complex over time has also consisted of other multiple buildings, including St. Joseph's Orphanage, The Jesus Marie Convent, a school, the church rectory, the Brothers' residence, and the former Msgr. Prevost High School. The parish also includes Notre Dame Cemetery, located in the city's south end.

In March 2012, the diocese announced that Notre Dame de Lourdes parish would be merging with nearby Immaculate Conception parish, with the new combined parish renamed Saint Bernadette Parish.  This name gives a connection to both parishes as it was Saint Bernadette who was reported to have witnessed the apparition of the Immaculate Conception (the Virgin Mary) at Lourdes, France.

History

Notre Dame de Lourdes parish was created in July 1874, and named after the 1858 apparitions of the Blessed Virgin Mary at Lourdes, France. The first pastor of the parish was Rev. Pierre Jean-Baptiste Bedard, from Montreal. The new parish included about 250 French-Canadian families and about 40 Irish families, who settled to work in the newly established cotton mills located in the east end of Fall River. The church has been through three buildings in its 144 year history.

The First Church 1874-1893

The Parish of Notre Dame de Lourdes first church was a wooden structure located where St. Joseph's Orphanage is now.  The building was erected in just six weeks in the summer of 1874, and measured 45 feet wide by 110 feet long. The parish would remain mixed until 1882, when Immaculate Conception parish was established nearby for the growing Irish population.

By 1888 however, the wooden church was badly dilapidated and no longer fit for use by the large parish, which had grown to 900 families. In 1890, parishioner and noted architect Louis G. Destremps was asked by Father Prevost to design a new church. The first church was destroyed by fire on November 12, 1893. Masses were then held in a temporary tent until the new church could be used.

The Second Church 1891-1982

On May 30, 1891 the cornerstone was laid on what was to be one of the largest and most beautiful churches in New England.  In December 1894 the lower church was completed and ready for use, much to the relief of the parish whose wooden church burnt a year earlier.  For the new church, Destremps designed "A system of trusses, beams, buttresses and metal rods with turnbuckles" to channel the weight of the roof directly down through the granite walls and leave an unobstructed view of the interior of the church.  M.J. Castagnoli, a master sculptor, was commissioned to do the plaster work on the columns, cornices, and bas-reliefs that decorated the church.  Master artist Ludovic Cremonini created 18 majestic oil paintings which adorned the walls and ceilings, including his interpretation of Rapheal's "Last Judgement", which was one of the largest paintings in the northeast.  In 1906 the giant pipe organ manufactured by the Brothers Casavant of St. Hyacinthe was installed and in November 29 of that year the church was officially dedicated.  At 310 feet, the twin steeples were the second tallest in the United States at the time of their construction. The building of the church cost a total of $315,000.00. The church building was meant to evoke the Notre Dame de Paris.

In 1920 the Sacred Heart Monument was erected on the grounds near the front of the church. It was dedicated to twenty two men from the parish who lost their lives fighting in World War I.  Only twenty one names appear on the monument as the twenty second man had enlisted with the Canadian Army. Lucien Hippolyte Gosselin of Manchester, New Hampshire was chosen as the sculptor of the bronze statues. The bronze work, done in Paris, consisted of The Sacred Heart statue, an Angel cradling a soldier, and three plaques, one for the Army, one for the Navy and the last with the names of the men.  The granite base was carved by Honore Savoie of Fall River.  The parishioners raised $26,373 to pay for the monument.  It is one of two war memorials in the city of Fall River which are not on public land.  The other is a bronze plaque on the granite steps of St. Patrick's Church (Good Shepherd Parish).

In 1924 the Carillon bells were installed in south steeple.

On February 11, 1934 The Lourdes Grotto was dedicated in the lower church.

In 1938, a hurricane badly shook the steeples and created a danger they might fall.  An original plan was to lower them from 310 feet to 160 feet and cut them off just above the belfries.  This plan was scrapped and the tall pinnacles were reduced to 235 feet instead; everything above a four-way arch above the clocks was removed and replaced with a shorter, simpler cap with smaller crosses at the top.  The simpler octagonal caps were tapered at roughly the same angle as the architecture of the arches, meshing well with them.

The church underwent several more changes over the years until the final restoration in 1982.  This restoration was in part to do much needed repair on the building and also to prepare the church to be placed on the National Register of Historic Places.  Unfortunately this never came to be, however St. Joseph's Orphanage, the JMA and Notre Dame School made it on the register.

The Fire May 11, 1982
In 1982 the church began a $1 million renovation project. During the restoration, a workman's blowtorch accidentally ignited the building, the roof timbers affected, starting a fire in the south steeple.  The dry wood caught quickly and the fire spread in minutes. The attic first caught fire. Carpenters ran to get the Sexton and all raced up the stairs of the tower to try to put the fire out.  Running into a wall of thick black smoke they could do nothing.  Now it was a race against time to get records, the Eucharist and anything else of value out of the church before the building was engulfed.  The fire department responded quickly but their efforts were hampered by strong winds, intense heat from the fire and low water pressure in the hydrants.  The fire, fanned by the high wind, spread to nearby buildings and soon engulfed homes and businesses on the next two streets.  When the fire finally came under control many buildings were gone.  The church was a total loss.  The empty granite shell a ruin.

A similar incident occurred in 2006 during restoration of Troitsky Cathedral in St. Petersburg, Russia.  An accident during its restoration caused a fire in which the main dome and a smaller dome burned.  Fortunately the main church was saved and the domes were rebuilt. Media outlets compared this fire to the 2019 Notre Dame fire in Paris.

The Third Church 1986–2018

With the loss of the church Masses were moved to St. Joseph's Orphanage till a new church could be built. Saturday & Sunday masses were held at Bishop Connolly High School. When the ruins were searched it was found that very little remained from the fire.  One stained-glass window, The Flight into Egypt, was spared destruction due to being in Connecticut for repair.  The third Notre Dame was designed and built around this window.  The three Angels that had adorned the Sanctuary Lamp and two candlesticks, though in the middle of the blaze, managed to survive the inferno.  These too are part of the new church.  The Sacred Heart Monument also miraculously survived the blaze even though it was in close proximity to the church.  It wasn't until 1986 that the new church was built and ready for use.  The orientation of the new building is reverse what the old one was.  The new churches "front" sits in the footprint of the old churches "rear".

In 2012, it was revealed that the parish of Notre Dame de Lourdes would be merging with the parish of Immaculate Conception in Fall River.  This occurred in June 2012 and they will be using Notre Dame as their church, taking on the name St. Bernadette.

School

Located in the Flint neighborhood, Notre Dame School opened in 1876, with the final building opening in 1890. Its enrollment declined from 1,616 in 1920 to 145 in 2008. It closed in 2008.

Parish closing

In May 2018, only 6 years after the merger, the church faced declining mass attendance and increasing debt. It was announced that St. Bernadette Parish would close and the final Mass was held on August 5, 2018 by Bishop Edgar M. da Cunha.

See also
 St. Anne's Church and Parish Complex
 St. Patrick's Church (Fall River, Massachusetts)

References

 A Call to Save - Author - Msgr. Thomas J. Harrington
 Fall River Herald News

Further reading
  - Reposted on April 15, 2019 in the wake of the Paris fire. The author was the bishop of Fall River.

External links
 
 
 Notre Dame Church, Fall River, Massachusetts - Digital Commonwealth

Roman Catholic churches in Fall River, Massachusetts
French-Canadian culture in Massachusetts